The Constitution of Yemen was ratified by popular referendum on May 16, 1991. It defines the republic as an independent and sovereign Arab and Islamic country and establishes sharia, or Islamic law, as the basis of all laws. In February 2001, several amendments were passed by national referendum extending the presidential term to seven years and the parliamentary term to six years and increasing the size and authority of the Shura Council.

Due to the 2011–2012 Yemeni revolution, President Abd Rabbuh Mansur Al-Hadi was expected to draft a new constitution in the 2012-2014 period. In January 2015, a committee had drafted a new constitution; however, both the GPC and Houthi members of the National Authority for Monitoring the Implementation of NDC Outcomes have refused to vote on this draft. This will most likely delay a planned referendum on the new constitution, and therefore the next presidential and parliamentary elections, which have been delayed until the referendum can go ahead.

References

Further reading

External links
Initial text of the 1991 constitution
Text of the Constitution after 1994 amendments
Text after the 2001 amendments

Law of Yemen
Yemen